Bennett Southwell, GC (21 March 1913 – 17 October 1940) was a member of a Royal Navy team carrying out bomb disposal when he was killed during the London blitz. He was awarded a posthumous George Cross.

Early life
Southwell was born on 21 March 1913, son of George Frederick Southwell, who worked on the railways- at the time of his son's birth, as a porter- and Sarah Elizabeth (née James). Southwell was educated at Meadow Hall Road School in Rotherham, subsequently working as a domestic gardener before taking employment at the hosiery manufacturer N. Corah & Sons. Before the outbreak of war, he married Marion Halford; they had a son, Michael.

Southwell was enlisted into the Royal Navy in 1939.

George Cross
Southwell was part of a team tackling an unexploded parachute mine on 17 October 1940 during the height of the blitz in Hoxton in the East End of London.

Along with and his companion, Sub-Lieutenant Jack Easton, they were called to a mine in Clifton Street, Shoreditch. The street was deserted and the  mine could be seen dangling from its parachute, wrapped round the chimney of a terraced house.

The pair had to climb through a window into the bedroom, as the mine was blocking the door wedged between a bedstead and the collapsing chimney. Easton set about defusing the mine with Southwell passing him tools through the window. They were working in this way when the rest of the chimney collapsed, setting off the fuse which began to tick. They ran for cover in a nearby air raid shelter but the mine exploded, destroying six surrounding streets and killing Southwell instantly.

Such was the damage that his body was undiscovered for a further six weeks.

Sub-Lieutenant Easton survived and both men were awarded the George Cross.

In October 1941 his widow Marion Southwell was presented with the George Cross by the King.

Citation
Southwell's George Cross citation appeared in the London Gazette on 23 January 1941:

Theft of medal

In 1945, Southwell's George Cross medal was stolen from a fete held by Southwell's former employer, the hosiery manufacturer N. Corah & Sons, who had a replica produced and presented to the family.

In 2003 the original medal appeared for sale as part of a private collection. A member of Southwell's family informed the police and the sale was stopped. The medal was then purchased from the Magor Collection and is now with the family of Southwell.

See also
 List of George Cross recipients

Notes

References

External links
 CWGC: Bennett Southwell

British recipients of the George Cross
Royal Navy recipients of the George Cross
Royal Navy sailors
Bomb disposal personnel
Deaths by airstrike during World War II
Royal Navy personnel killed in World War II
1913 births
1940 deaths
People from Rotherham
Military personnel from Yorkshire